Palghat T. S. Mani Iyer (1912–1981), born Thiruvilvamalai Ramaswamy was one of the leading mridangists in the field of Carnatic music. He, along with his contemporaries Palani Subramaniam Pillai and Ramanathapuram C. S. Murugabhoopathy, are revered as the "Holy Trinity of Mrudangam".  Mani Iyer was the first mridangist to be awarded the Sangeetha Kalanidhi (1966) presented by the Music Academy of Madras, the  Padma Bhushan (1971) and  the Sangeet Natak Akademi Awards(1956) presented by the Government of India.

Early life and background
He was born in a Palakkad brahmin family on 12 June 1912 at Pazhayanur, then in Tiruvilvamala Taluk, in Palghat District, Kerala (now located in Thrissur District) to Sesham Bhagavatar and Aanandaambaal as their second son. Mani was named Ramaswami at birth— after his grandfather who was a school teacher besides being a good singer. Mani Iyer learnt his music from his parents in his native Pazhayyanur. His maiden public performance was at the age of 10 at a harikatha discourses by Sivaramakrishna Bhagavathar. The mridangam player who was supposed to play had failed to turn up and Mani Iyer substituted. Later he caught the eye of Thanjavur Vaidyanatha Iyer who taught him the intricacies that invested his recitals with remarkable purity. Mani Iyer came into prominence in 1924, after accompanying Chembai Vaidyanatha Bhaagavathar in a music concert at Jagannatha Bhaktha Sabha in Madras (now called Chennai).

Career
Mani Iyer accompanied all the leading vocal artists of his era. He was also the guru for later mridangam players such as Late Palghat R. Raghu, Late Mavelikkara Velukkutty Nair, Umayalpuram K. Sivaraman, Thanjavur R.Ramadas, Kamalakar Rao, Late G. Harishankar (kanjira), etc.

Before Mani Iyer's arrival in the music scene, the three mridangists Nagercoil S.Ganesa Iyer,  Alaganambi Pillai and Dakshinamurthy Pillai (who played the kanjira also), dominated the percussion scene. The way in which Mani Iyer played changed the style of mridangam playing from just keeping beat for the main artist's music to being an instrument in its own right. A comment from Y. G. Doraisamy: "It was Mani Iyer who started the now prevalent trend of the mridangam, not just keeping the time with tekkas and moras, but actively accompanying the musical phrasing, so as to be a rhythmic running commentary, reproducing on the drum all the subtleties and rhythmic complexities of the musical composition."

Palghat R. Raghu, a disciple of Mani Iyer, describes his guru as a genius in that he showed music followers the manner of blending with the music of the main artist in handling the kritis of every conceivable mood and tempo. By his consistent excellence he could raise the concert to thrilling heights.

He had his eccentricities, and he refused to accompany women artists for a long time. But after his daughter married D K Pattammal's son, he accompanied Pattamal (पट्टमाळ), considered one of the three singers who make up Trinity of Women Carnatic Music singers in the 20th C. Afterwards he also accompanied M L Vasanthakumari.

When Semmangudi Srinivasa Iyer was asked to pick geniuses of Carnatic music, he came up with only three names -- T.R. Mahalingam, T.N. Rajarathnam Pillai and Palghat Mani Iyer.

Personal life
Born on 12 June 1912, in Pazhayannur village near Palghat, Mani Iyer lived a full 70 years and died on 30 May 1981. He was the father of the noted artists Mridangist T. R. Rajamani, vocalist Lalitha Sivakumar, violinist T.R. Rajaram, Smt. Lakshmi Vaidhyanathan and Sri. Thyagarajan. He was also the grandfather of the noted singer Nithyasree Mahadevan and Carnatic vocalist Palghat Ramprasad.

References

External links
 South Indian Percussionist page
 Palghat Mani Iyer website
 An article in The Hindu - The Genius of Sound and Silence
 Musings of a Mridangam Maestro
  accompanying Chembai Vaidyanatha Bhagavatar on the Mridangam with Chowdiah on the violin.
Mani Iyer Centenary at Kalpathy

1912 births
1981 deaths
Indian percussionists
Mridangam players
Recipients of the Padma Bhushan in arts
Sangeetha Kalanidhi recipients
20th-century Indian musicians
Recipients of the Sangeet Natak Akademi Award
People from Palakkad district
20th-century drummers